Rheumatology is a monthly peer-reviewed medical journal published by Oxford University Press. It is one of two official journals of the British Society for Rheumatology, the other being Rheumatology Advances in Practice. The journal covers all aspects of paediatric and adult rheumatological conditions. The editor-in-chief is Marwan Bukhari (Royal Lancaster Infirmary).

Article types
The journal publishes the following article types: 
 Original articles
 Reviews
 Editorials
 Guidelines
 Concise reports
 Meta-analyses
 Original case reports
 Clinical vignettes
 Letters
 Matters arising from published material

Editors-in-chief
The following persons have been editors-in-chief:
 Jaap van Laar (2014-2018)
 Robert J. Moots (2009-2013)
 Richard Watts (2003-2008)
 David Scott (1997-2002)
 H. A. Bird (1991-1997)
 Terry Gibson (1986-1991)
 Rodney Grahame (1982-1986)
 Douglas Woolf (1968-1982)
 P. Hume Kendall (1963-1968)
 A. C. Boyle (1956-1963)
 Hugh Burt (1952-1956)

Abstracting and indexing
The journal is abstracted and indexed in Biological Abstracts, BIOSIS Previews, Current Contents/Clinical Medicine, EMBASE/Excerpta Medica, ProQuest, MEDLINE/PubMed, and Science Citation Index. According to the Journal Citation Reports, its 2020 impact factor is 7.580, ranking it 5th out of 32 journals in the category "Rheumatology".

External links

The British Society for Rheumatology

Oxford University Press academic journals
Monthly journals
English-language journals
Publications established in 1952
Rheumatology journals
Academic journals associated with learned and professional societies